Luke Nelson may refer to:

Luke Nelson (baseball) (1893–1985), American baseball player
Luke Nelson (basketball) (born 1995), British basketball player
Luke Nelson (ski mountaineer) (born 1980), American ski mountaineer